Ty Smith (born March 24, 2000) is a Canadian professional ice hockey defenceman for the  Pittsburgh Penguins of the National Hockey League (NHL). He was drafted in the first round, 17th overall, in the 2018 NHL Entry Draft by the New Jersey Devils.

Playing career
Smith was selected first overall by the Spokane Chiefs in the 2015 WHL Bantam Draft. In his rookie season with the Chiefs, Smith was named the team’s Rookie of the Year and Scholastic Player of the Year. The following year, Smith had a breakout season setting a new franchise record for most points in a single game by a defenseman and being named the WHL Scholastic Player of the Year. Smith was also named the Chiefs Defenseman of the Year.

On August 20, 2018, Smith signed a three-year, entry-level contract with the New Jersey Devils, who had drafted him 17th overall in the 2018 NHL Entry Draft. Smith attended the Devils training camp but was reassigned to the Chiefs on September 28. On October 24, Smith was named co-captain of the Chiefs alongside Jaret Anderson-Dolan.

Smith made the Devils opening night roster for the 2020–21 season, making his debut on January 14, 2021, against the Boston Bruins and recording his first NHL goal in the Devils' 3–2 shootout loss. Smith would go on to record points in each of his first five NHL games, the second-longest streak ever for a rookie defenceman in the NHL behind only Marek Židlický. Smith continued his strong start to his rookie season, recording eight points in his first nine games before being placed on the COVID-19 reserve list on February 2, along with 13 of his Devils' teammates. After the season Smith was named to the NHL All-Rookie Team.

On July 16, 2022, Smith was traded by the Devils, along with a 2023 third-round pick to the Pittsburgh Penguins in exchange for defenseman John Marino.

International play

 

Smith was named the captain of Team Canada at the 2016 Winter Youth Olympics. The following year, he was named an alternate captain for Team Canada at the 2017 Ivan Hlinka Memorial Tournament.

Career statistics

Regular season and playoffs

International

Awards and honours

References

External links
 

2000 births
Living people
Canadian ice hockey defencemen
Ice hockey people from Alberta
Ice hockey people from Saskatchewan
Ice hockey players at the 2016 Winter Youth Olympics
National Hockey League first-round draft picks
New Jersey Devils draft picks
New Jersey Devils players
Pittsburgh Penguins players
Spokane Chiefs players
Sportspeople from Lloydminster
Wilkes-Barre/Scranton Penguins players
Youth Olympic silver medalists for Canada